Thierry Desmarest (born 18 December 1945 in Paris) is a French businessman. He is the current honorary chairman of Total. He was also chief executive officer at Total from May 1995 until February 2007, when he was replaced by Christophe de Margerie.

In 1999, Desmarest had led the TotalFina oil company through the acquisition of a Belgium oil company, Petrofina, for $12 billion. In July 1999, Desmarest had also led the TotalFina enterprise through the acquisition of Elf Acquitaine for $44 billion. It was this procurement that raised TotalFina to the fourth largest oil company in the world. 

Desmarest has multinational and continental experience within the oil industry. As a head of the exploration and production department at TotalFina he was stationed in Venezuela and Algeria. During his time over seas, he procured oil and gas reserves to add to Totalfina's oil supply. In 1995, Desmarest he closed a landmark deal with Tehran in Iran making Totalfina the first oil company outside of Iran to drill for oil since 1979. Desmarest's contemporaries have nicknamed him "Le Petit Prince" (The Little Prince).

His position as chairman of the board of directors of Total expired on 18 December 2015, in line with the age limits specified by the group. Thierry Desmarest still remains honorary chairman of Total and will remain as a director until the annual shareholders’ meeting on 24 May 2016.

References 

1945 births
Living people
École Polytechnique alumni
Mines Paris - PSL alumni
Corps des mines
French chief executives
TotalEnergies people
Air Liquide people
Officiers of the Légion d'honneur